The Oakdale Lumberjacks were a minor league baseball team based in Oakdale, Louisiana. In 1920, the Oakdale Lumberjacks played as members of the Class D level Louisiana State League, winning the league championship in the league's only season of play. Oakdale hosted home minor league games at the Oakdale High School Field.

History
Minor league baseball began in Oakdale, Louisiana in 1920, when the Oakdale "Lumberjacks" became charter members of the six–team Class D level "Louisiana State Baseball League," also known as the "Louisiana State League." The Oakdale Lumberjacks were joined by the Abbeville Sluggers, Alexandria Tigers, Lafayette Hubs, New Iberia Sugar Boys and Rayne Rice Birds in the 1920 league play, which began on April 20, 1920.

The Oakdale use of the "Lumberjacks" moniker corresponds to local industry in the era. Oakdale was noted to be "strictly a sawmill town" in the era. There were at least five saw mills in operation in Oakdale in the era.

It was noted in publications that the Oakdale Lumberjacks started the season slowly, before winning 15 out of 17 games to reach 1st place in the standings.

The Oakdale Lumberjacks forfeited 7 wins through June 27, 1920, due to using ineligible players.

On July 15, 1920, the Oakdale Lumberjacks were in 1st place when the Louisiana State League folded. New Iberia and Rayne had folded on July 6, 1920. Oakdale had a record of 37–24, playing under manager Louis Bremerhof, when the Louisiana State League League folded. The Lumberjacks finished 1.0 game ahead 2nd place New Iberia Sugar Boys (36–25). They were followed by the Lafayette Hubs (36–31), Abbeville Sluggers (33–35), Rayne Rice Birds (30–33), Alexandria Tigers (23–47) in the final 1920 Louisiana State League standings.

Oakdale, Louisiana has not hosted another minor league team.

The ballpark
The 1920 Oakdale Lumberjacks played home minor league home games at High School Field. Still in operation as a public high school today, Oakdale High School is located at 101 South 13th Street, Oakdale, Louisiana.

Year–by–year records

Notable alumni
The player roster of the 1920 Oakdale Lumberjacks is unknown.

References

External links
Oakdale - Baseball Reference

Defunct minor league baseball teams
Professional baseball teams in Louisiana
Defunct baseball teams in Louisiana
Baseball teams established in 1920
Baseball teams disestablished in 1920
Allen Parish, Louisiana